Ženski košarkaški klub Jedinstvo Piemonte is a women's basketball club from Tuzla, Bosnia and Herzegovina. The club won three Yugoslav Women's Basketball League championships during the 1980s, as Jedinstvo Aida.

In 1989 Jedinstvo Tuzla won the EuroLeague Women, and they played in the 1990 Ronchetti Cup final.

The club's best and most famous player of all time was FIBA Hall of Fame inductee Razija Mujanović. Among the other players were Mara Lakić, Zorica Dragičević, Naida Hot, Smilja Rađenović, Ilvana Zvizdić, Jadranka Savić, Vesna Pođanin, Dragana Jeftić and Stojanka Došić, many of which also represented Yugoslavia with the national team. The most famous ex-coach is Mihajlo Vuković, who led the team during the successful years.

History
The club was founded in 1945 immediately after the liberation of Yugoslavia in World War II, the same as its male counterpart KK Sloboda Dita.

The club was amateur since its inception, in the early 1970s. The club played in the second Yugoslav Basketball League, with mediocre results until the 1979/1980 season, when they were promoted to the first Yugoslavian Basketball League. However, they were relegated the following year. The club got back into the first league in the 1982/1983 season, where they finished in eighth position and were secure from relegation.

The club kept growing and getting better and better results, until winning the title in the 1986/1987 season.

In the 1987/1988 season Jedinstvo played in Europe for the first time. They beat Arama Ankara in the qualification round. They then beat Universitatea Cluj in the first round, and got into Group, where they finished third. In home competition they weren't dominant as the previous year, but they managed to secure the title in the playoffs after the third game.

In the season that followed, 1987/1988, Jedinstvo was once again representative of Yugoslavia in Euroleague and they won competition over Vicenza, but they failed to clinch the domestic title after finishing the regular part of season as first.

In season 1989/1990, Jedinstvo won its last Yugoslavia title, and finished in second place in Ronchetti Cup.

In the 1990/1991 season team played in Euroleague, and they finished fifth in Yugoslav League short of two games. This was the last Yugoslavian basketball season.

Names 
ŽKK Jedinstvo Tuzla, Jedinstvo Trocal, Jedinstvo BH Telecom

Arena
Jedinstvo plays its games in SPKC Mejdan in Tuzla, usually in a small arena, that has a capacity of 600.

Current roster
Roster for the 2018/2019 season:

Honours

Yugoslavia
Championship of Yugoslavia Champions 1st place 1987, 1988, 1990
Yugoslav Cup Champions 1st place 1988, 1991

Bosnia and Herzegovina
Championship of BiH Champions 1st place 1994, 1996, 1997
Runner-Up 2nd place 2006, 2013
Cup of KS RBiH Champions 1st place 2002
Cup of BiH Champions 1st place 2010
Runner-Up 2nd place 2011, 2015

European cups
FIBA Women's European Champions Cup Semi-finalist 3rd place 1988
FIBA Women's European Champions Cup Champions 1st place 1989
Ronchetti Cup Runner-Up 2nd place 1990

Notable former players
Razija Mujanović
Mara Lakić – Brčaninović
Tanja Pavlić - Ilić
Naida Hot - Sušić
Stojanka Došić
Milena Djukić - Lučić
Zorica Dragičević
Smilja Radjenović
Ilvana Zvizdić
Radmila Maksimović
Jadranka Savić
Dragana Jeftić
Vesna Pođanin

Notable former coaches
Mihajlo Vuković

See also
KK Sloboda Tuzla

References

External links
ŽKK Jedinstvo Tuzla at eurobasket.com

Jedinstvo Piemonte
Sport in Tuzla
Women's basketball teams in Yugoslavia
Basketball teams established in 1945
ŽKK Jedinstvo Tuzla